Joseph Boyd Poindexter (April 14, 1869 – December 3, 1951) was the eighth Territorial Governor of Hawaii and served from 1934 to 1942.

Early life
Joseph Boyd Poindexter was born in Canyon City, Oregon to Thomas W. and Margaret Pipkin Poindexter. He attended Wesleyan University and earned his LL.B.  degree from Washington University in St. Louis. He was admitted to the Montana Bar in 1892, and served as County Attorney of Beaverhead County, Montana from 1897 to 1903. He was  appointed judge of the Fifth Judicial District in Beaverhead, Madison, and  Jefferson Counties,  Montana in 1909.  He later  served as a district judge in Montana from 1909 to 1915, and he later served  as Attorney General of Montana from 1915 to 1917.

Career
In 1917, President Woodrow Wilson appointed Poindexter as Judge on the United States District Court for the District of Hawaii.  Poindexter served in that capacity from May 14, 1917, to February 16, 1924.  He then practiced law in Hawaii until 1934. President Franklin D. Roosevelt appointed Poindexter the eighth governor of Hawaii on January 30, 1934.

A joint Congressional Committee visited Hawaii in 1937 and submitted a report in February 1938 recommending a plebiscite for Hawaii statehood. The plebiscite, held on November 5, 1940, resulted in the voters recommending statehood for Hawaii.

Poindexter was appointed to the governorship of Hawaii by Roosevelt in 1934; he was reappointed to the governorship in 1938. Poindexter was the only  second  territorial governor to that point to serve more than one term of office.

In the immediate aftermath of the Japanese attack on Pearl Harbor on December 7, 1941, Poindexter placed the territory under martial law and allowed the U.S. military to form a military government. He mobilized the Hawaii Territorial Guard while the attack was still ongoing and appointed himself its captain general. The military government would continue until 1943. After his term expired, Poindexter remained in office until August 24, 1942, when his successor, Ingram Stainback, was confirmed.
He remained in Hawaii and practiced law and in July 1943, the Hawaii supreme Court appointed him as one of the trustees of the Bernice Pauahi Bishop Estate.

Gubernatorial accomplishments

An editorial at his death credited Poindexter with a balanced budget, improved civil service and wage laws that regulated child labor and improved public health and welfare. During his administration the Hawaii Housing Authority was established, and projects such as the "Mayor Wright homes" (named for George F. Wright) were begun.
He advocated for larger airports and other major public works projects, including roads, parks, schools and the Ala Wai Golf Course.

Later life
Poindexter resumed his law practice after leaving the governorship.  In July 1943, the Hawaii Supreme Court appointed him a trustee of the Bernice Pauahi Bishop Estate (now Kamehameha Schools), in which capacity he served until his death in Honolulu, Hawaii on December 3, 1951. His picture appeared on the cover of the July 23, 1934 Times Magazine. He is buried next to his wife Margaret in Mountain View cemetery in Dillion Montana.

Personal life

Poindexter married Margaret Conger in Dillon, Montana on April 22, 1897. The couple had two children, Everton and Helen.

Fraternal memberships

Benevolent and Protective Order of Elks
Freemason
Shriner

References

Further reading

 Dyer, C.Y. (editor), Biographical Sketches of Hawaii's Rulers, 8th ed. (Honolulu: Bishop National Bank of Hawaii, 1957), p. 34-35.

1869 births
1951 deaths
Montana state court judges
Montana Attorneys General
Governors of the Territory of Hawaii
Wesleyan University alumni
Washington University School of Law alumni
Montana lawyers
People from Canyon City, Oregon
Hawaii Democrats
Judges of the United States District Court for the Territory of Hawaii
United States district court judges appointed by Woodrow Wilson